Night Winds is a 1978 fantasy horror collection of short stories by Karl Edward Wagner about his character Kane. 

The stories are "Undertow", "Two Suns Setting", "The Dark Muse", "Raven's Eyrie", "Lynortis Reprise", and "Sing a Last Song of Valdese".

Karl Edward Wagner
Horror short story collections
1978 short story collections

pl:Wichry Nocy